Choreutis trogalia is a moth in the family Choreutidae. It was described by Edward Meyrick in 1912. It is found in Assam, India.

References

Choreutis
Moths described in 1912
Taxa named by Edward Meyrick